Persea bullata is a species of plant in the family Lauraceae. It is endemic to Ecuador.  Its natural habitat is subtropical or tropical moist montane forests.

References

Flora of Ecuador
bullata
Near threatened plants
Taxonomy articles created by Polbot